Abdul Mannan Siddique (??-2000) was a Major General of Bangladesh Army. He had served as Minister of Home Affairs and Minister of Housing and Public Works.

Career
Siddique was a former Quartermaster general of Bangladesh Army. He was also the Master general of ordinances. He served as the Minister of Home Affairs and Minister of Housing and Public Works in the cabinet of Hussain Muhammad Ershad. After retirement he founded and served as the chairperson of Phoenix Insurance Company Limited.

Death
Siddique died on 2 May 2000.

References

2000 deaths
Bangladesh Army generals
Home Affairs ministers of Bangladesh
Housing and Public Works ministers of Bangladesh